The 2018 PGA Tour Latinoamérica was the seventh season of PGA Tour Latinoamérica. PGA Tour Latinoamérica was operated and run by the PGA Tour. The season began in March at the Stella Artois Open in Antigua, Guatemala and concluded in December at the Shell Championship at Trump National Doral Miami, marking the return of a PGA Tour-sanctioned event to the Miami resort that hosted events from 1962 to 2016.

Schedule
The following table lists official events during the 2018 season.

Unofficial events
The following events were sanctioned by the PGA Tour Latinoamérica, but did not carry official money, nor were wins official.

Order of Merit
The Order of Merit was based on prize money won during the season, calculated in U.S. dollars. The top five players on the tour earned status to play on the 2019 Korn Ferry Tour.

Developmental Series
The following table lists Developmental Series events during the 2018 season.

Notes

References

PGA Tour Latinoamérica
PGA Tour Latinoamerica